Zamin Lashkari (also Romanized as Zamīn Lashkarī; also known as Zamīn Lashgarī) is a village in Jask Rural District, in the Central District of Jask County, Hormozgan Province, Iran. At the 2006 census, its population was 321, in 61 families.

References 

Populated places in Jask County